Andraya Michele Howard (born January 23, 1985) is an American media personality, model, actress, and fashion designer.

Early life
Andraya Michele was born and raised in Reading, Pennsylvania. She has two children, one with her ex fiancé and Orlando Scandrick. She is of African-American and Italian descent.

Career

Michele first came to the attention of the public as the girlfriend of entertainer Chris Brown. She was part of the freshman cast of the VH1 series Basketball Wives LA in 2011, and in the same year made her first scripted acting debut in TV One's Will to Love opposite Keshia Knight-Pulliam and Marques Houston. She remained as part of the cast of Basketball Wives LA until her departure at the end of the show's fourth season in 2015.  She had a supporting role in the 2016 film The Perfect Match.

She owns a number of fashion lines: her swimwear line Mint Swim launched in 2011, and her lifestyle clothing line Fine Ass Girls launched in 2013. In November 2016 she launched another clothing line, Beige & Coco.

Filmography 
Basketball Wives LA as herself (2011) 
Real Husbands of Hollywood as herself (2013) 
Will to Love as Candice Koleto (2015) 
The Perfect Match as Holly (2016) 
Bring Out the Lady as Dody Monroe (2016) 
True to the Game as Cherelle (2017) 
'Til Death Do Us Part as Amanda (2017) 
We Belong Together as Tracy Jacobs/ Laura Santiago (2018) 
All In as Gina (2018)
Star as Chloe David (2018)
Tales as Viveca (TV Series) (2019)
Don Toliver - Cardigan (Music Video) (2020)
L.A.'s Finest as Charlotte Hume (TV Series, 2 episodes) (2020)
Be Someone as Mia (TV Series)(2021)
The Fight That Never Ends as Beverly Williams (TV Movie) (2021)

References

External links

1985 births
Living people
African-American fashion designers
Participants in American reality television series
African-American female models
Actresses from Philadelphia
Actors from Reading, Pennsylvania
Hip hop models
American fashion designers
American women fashion designers
21st-century African-American people
21st-century African-American women
20th-century African-American people
20th-century African-American women
American people of Italian descent